This article lists orbital and suborbital launches during the second half of the year 2022.

For all other spaceflight activities, see 2022 in spaceflight. For launches in the first half of 2022, see List of spaceflight launches in January–June 2022.



Orbital launches 

|colspan=8 style="background:white;"|

July 
|-

|colspan=8 style="background:white;"|

August 
|-

|colspan=8 style="background:white;"|

September 
|-

|colspan=8 style="background:white;"|

October 
|-

|colspan=8 style="background:white;"|

November 
|-

|colspan=8 style="background:white;"|

December 
|-

|colspan=8 style="background:white;"| 

|}

Suborbital flights 

|}

Notes

References

External links 

2022 in spaceflight
Spaceflight by year
Spaceflight